Nices Arena　(ナイスアリーナ)　is a multi-use indoor arena in Yurihonjo, Akita. Groundbreaking and construction began on March 18, 2016, and opened in October 2018. The arena's parking lot can hold 1,000 cars. Yurihonjo city introduced the Daktronics high-definition LED centerhung  display for the second time in the prefecture. "EXPERIENCE THE DAKTRONICS DIFFERENCE" was the very first message on this HD video set. There is no ribbon displays and "see through" shot clocks.  It is named after the supermarket Nices based in Akita city. The store pays JPY3.1 million annually for the naming rights.

Facilities

Main arena (91m x 38m, 3,458 square metres)
Sub-arena  (32m x 20m, 640 square metres)
Kendo area
Judo area
Training room
Fitness studio
Changing rooms
Shower room
Conference rooms

Additional seats
It is announced that the city will add 480 new seats in 2020. The budget is 100 million yen.

Attendance records
The largest crowd to ever gather at the Nices Arena was on December 7, 2019, for Badminton S/J League games, with a reported attendance of 4,100.
The record for a basketball game is 3,825, set on March 3, 2019, when the Osaka Evessa defeated the Happinets 88–73.

Access

From Ugo-Honjō Station: Shinai-sen of Ugo Kotsu Bus. Get off at Nice Arena.
From Akita Station: Express Akita-Honjo sen of Ugo Kotsu Bus . Get off at Hello Work Honjo-mae.

References

External links
Homepage
 Yurihonjo Arena facebook
Yurihonjo Arena

2018 establishments in Japan
Akita Northern Happinets
Badminton venues
Sports venues completed in 2018
Sports venues in Akita Prefecture
Indoor arenas in Japan
Basketball venues in Japan
Volleyball venues in Japan
Yurihonjō